The SNCASE SE-700 was a three-seat passenger autogyro designed during World War II.  Two were completed but only the first flew and the programme was soon abandoned.

Design and development

Design of the SE-700 began in 1939 but World War II delayed its completion and first flight until 25 May 1945.  Compared with most autogyros of its time it had a very advanced appearance, with a sleek, streamlined fuselage, an enclosed central engine and a three blade rotor on a straight edged, aerofoil section  pylon. The enclosed cabin, which seated three, was ahead of the engine and behind a nose which tapered smoothly into the spinner of the two blade propeller.

At the rear of the short fuselage was a low aspect ratio tailplane, externally braced to the fuselage underside and fitted with elevators. It carried swept, oval tail fins taken from the SNCASE SE-100 twin engine fighter at its tips, which were externally braced to the tailplane underside.  The fins were fitted with rudders and, more unusually, wheels; the SE.100 had fin mounted tail wheels but the SE.700 had tricycle gear so these became the main wheels, tidily faired into the bottom of the fins. Its nosewheel retracted backwards, placing the wheel partly in the fuselage and its leg within a small ventral fairing.

The first prototype, piloted by Stakenburg, flew with a  Renault 6Q-01 six cylinder, inverted air-cooled inline engine. It proved difficult to control and crashed after a few test flights. Though the damage was not great, the SE-700 was not repaired and SNCASE decided instead to complete a more refined second prototype, the SE-701 or SE-700A. This was fitted with a more powerful  Béarn 6D-07 engine, another six cylinder, inverted air-cooled inline.  However, the company then decided that the post-war market for small commuter autogyros was too limited to proceed, so the SE-700A did not fly and a proposed production series of four SE-702s or 700Bs were not begun.

Specifications (SE-700A)

References

SE-0700
Single-engined tractor autogyros
SNCASE SE-0700
Aircraft first flown in 1945
Autogyros